Fort Mitchell is an unincorporated community in Lunenburg County, Virginia, United States.

Geography

References

Unincorporated communities in Virginia
Unincorporated communities in Lunenburg County, Virginia